The enzyme ectoine synthase catalyzes the chemical reaction

(2S)-4-acetamido-2-aminobutanoate   L-ectoine + H2O

This enzyme belongs to the family of lyases, specifically the hydro-lyases, which cleave carbon-oxygen bonds.  The systematic name of this enzyme class is (2S)-4-acetamido-2-aminobutanoate (L-ectoine-forming). Other names in common use include N-acetyldiaminobutyrate dehydratase, ''N-acetyldiaminobutanoate dehydratase, L-ectoine synthase, EctC, and 4-N''-acetyl-L-2,4-diaminobutanoate hydro-lyase (L-ectoine-forming).  This enzyme participates in glycine, serine and threonine metabolism.

References

 
 
 
 

EC 4.2.1
Enzymes of unknown structure